The 2007–08 Ligue Magnus season was the 87th season of the Ligue Magnus, the top level of ice hockey in France. 14 teams participated in the league, and Dragons de Rouen won their ninth league title.

Regular season

Playoffs

Relegation 
 Chamonix Hockey Club - Hockey Club de Caen 3:2 (4:5, 7:6 OT, 5:4 SO, 3:5, 6:2)

External links 
 Season on hockeyarchives.info

1
Fra
Ligue Magnus seasons